Kanvi is a village in district Mahendragarh in the state of Haryana, India.

References

Villages in Mahendragarh district